Five of Cups is a Minor Arcana tarot card.

Tarot cards are used throughout much of Europe to play Tarot card games.

In English-speaking countries, where the games are largely unknown, Tarot cards came to be utilized primarily for divinatory purposes.

Divination usage

This card often carries the meaning of emotional dejection, disappointment and sorrow over past events. There may be a tendency to "cry over spilt milk". It can also represent the failure to  see the good in a given situation. Although the figure represented on the card has lost three of his cups, two still stand, yet he fails to appreciate what he has left. A river flows in front of the figure, with a bridge leading to a safe destination, and yet he remains focused on the loss of his cups.

References

Suit of Cups